Cristian-Vasile Terheș (born December 4, 1978) is a Romanian politician currently serving as a Member of the European Parliament for Christian Democratic National Peasants' Party (PNȚ-CD) after being elected on the Social Democratic Party (PSD) list.

He joined the Christian Democratic National Peasants' Party (PNȚ-CD) in May 2020 and then became a member of European Christian Political Movement (ECPM).

Biography
Born in Zalău, he studied theology at Babeș-Bolyai University in Cluj-Napoca, and was consecrated priest of the Romanian Greek Catholic Church in Oradea. He then studied journalism at Fullerton College in Fullerton, California and worked at Santiago Canyon College in Orange, California. He settled in Irvine, California, and became a clergyman at a Greek Catholic Church there, but also worked as a business analyst.

Terheș was involved in Romanian politics, especially in opposition to the ruling PSD, which he called corruption. He became famous in 2012, when he was part of the referendum campaign on the dismissal of Romanian President Traian Băsescu; he lobbied for Băsescu (who was opposed to the Social Democrats) in the United States Congress. In 2014, Terheș opposed the election of Victor Ponta (from the PSD) as president.

In 2016, he became a regular commentator on the Antena 3 television station affiliated with the PSD and on România TV. At the same time, he became a supporter of the ruling PSD, in his public comments he supported the suspension of the liberal national president Klaus Iohannis. In 2019 he ranked fourth on the PSD list for the European Parliament and was elected a member of the European Parliament. Due to political activity incompatible with his status as a priest, the Romanian Catholic Eparchy of Oradea Mare released him in 2019 from the exercise of priestly functions.  

In May 2020, Terheș declared his transition to the National Peasant Christian Democratic Party and the European Conservatives and Reformists group. On 11th November 2021, he lodged an application with the European Court of Human Rights in Strasbourg protesting various measures taken by the Romanian government to tackle the Covid-19 pandemic, alleging a violation of Article 5 (the right to liberty and security). His application was rejected by the ECtHR on grounds of inadmissibility, with the Court noting that the measures "could not be equated with house arrest" and that Terheș had failed to explain their impact on his personal situation. In February 2022, he criticized in a press conference Prime Minister Justin Trudeau's handling of the Canada convoy protest, comparing him with Nicolae Ceaușescu.

References

External links
 Home | Cristian Terheș | MEPs | European Parliament

1978 births
Living people
People from Zalău
Babeș-Bolyai University alumni
Fullerton College alumni
Romanian Greek-Catholic priests
MEPs for Romania 2019–2024
Social Democratic Party (Romania) MEPs
Social Democratic Party (Romania) politicians
Christian Democratic National Peasants' Party politicians